V. S. Mahalingam is a distinguished DRDO scientist and Director of Centre for Artificial Intelligence and Robotics. He is an alumnus of Chennai's College of Engineering, Guindy.

References

Indian computer scientists
Living people
Year of birth missing (living people)
Scientists from Chennai